Turini (Aymara turi tower, -ni a suffix, "the one with a tower", also spelled Torrini) is a  mountain in the Bolivian Andes. It is located in the La Paz Department, Loayza Province, Luribay Municipality. Turini lies between Jach'a Walluni in the southeast and Lluxita in the northwest. The Malla Jawira flows along its slopes.

References 

Mountains of La Paz Department (Bolivia)